Gerald Christopher Sundquist (6 October 1955 – 1 August 1993) was an English actor.

Early life 
Sundquist was born in Chorlton and grew up there with his older brother and younger sister. He developed an interest in acting at primary school and joined the Stretford Children's Theatre while still at school St. Augustine's R.C. Grammar School in Wythenshawe.

On leaving school at 16 he worked briefly on the night shift at the Kellogg's factory in Manchester, but keen to pursue his acting career he soon moved to London.

Career 
He appeared in various film and television roles during the 1970s and early 1980s, most notably Soldier & Me, The Mallens and The Siege of Golden Hill, with guest appearances on shows such as Space: 1999 alongside Martin Landau and fellow guest star Patrick Troughton (episode "The Dorcons"). He appeared as Alan Strang in Equus at the Albery theatre in the mid-1970s.

His films included The Black Panther (1977), Meetings with Remarkable Men (1979), Passion Flower Hotel (1978), aka Boarding School, playing Fibs alongside Nastassja Kinski, whom he dated for a while, and the 1979 British disco film The Music Machine. He had a part in Youssef Chahine's acclaimed Alexandria... Why? (1978, Berlin Film Festival Silver Bear winner). He played Pip in Great Expectations (1981) and Gringoire in The Hunchback of Notre Dame (1982), and appeared to have a promising career, but after his appearances in The Last Days of Pompeii (1984) and the horror film Don't Open Till Christmas (1984), his career and personal life went into steep decline, with him later developing a drug problem. He played a character role in an episode of the TV police serial The Bill in 1992, his first acting role in eight years.

Death 

On 1 August 1993, Sundquist committed suicide by jumping under a train at Norbiton railway station in England.

Filmography

References 
Tragedy Behind a Magical Fantasy Daily Mirror interview with Geoffrey Sundquist, 27 November 1997. Retrieved from The Free Library, 10 January 2012.
IMDB biography

External links 
 

1955 births
1993 suicides
20th-century English male actors
People from Chorlton-cum-Hardy
Male actors from Manchester
English male film actors
English male television actors
Suicides by train
Suicides in England